National Police may refer to the national police forces of several countries:

Afghanistan: Afghan National Police
Haiti: Haitian National Police
Colombia: National Police of Colombia
Cuba: Cuban National Police
East Timor: National Police of East Timor
El Salvador: National Civil Police of El Salvador
France: National Police (France)
India: 
Indian Police Service
Indian Imperial Police
Indonesia: Indonesian National Police
Japan:
 National Police Agency (Japan)
 National Police Reserve
Kenya:
 Kenya National Police Service
Liechtenstein: National Police (Liechtenstein)
Luxembourg: Grand Ducal Police
Monaco: Public Security of Monaco
The Netherlands: National Police Corps (Netherlands)
Nicaragua: National Police of Nicaragua
Niger: National Police (Niger)
Peru: National Police of Peru
Philippines: Philippine National Police
Portugal: Public Security Police
South Korea: National Police Agency (South Korea)
Spain: National Police Corps (Spain)
Taiwan: National Police Agency (Taiwan)
Ukraine: National Police of Ukraine
Vietnam: Republic of Vietnam National Police
Venezuela: Venezuelan National Police